Emmanuel Chinenye Emenike (born 10 May 1987) is a Nigerian former footballer who played as a striker.

Club career

Delta Force F.C.
Emenike started his football career with Delta Force. At the club, he experienced many hardships. He walked on foot to training and back, even though it could take an hour and a half. The Delta State government also refused the club funds, so he wasn't paid regularly.

Mpumalanga Black Aces
Later on his career, he would earn his first salary when he moved to South Africa. He transferred to South African National First Division team Mpumalanga Black Aces in January 2008 and debuted against Dynamos F.C. on 17 February 2008. He scored his first goal with the team in his debut but Black Aces lost the match 4–2. He was a member of the Black Aces team that lost against Mamelodi Sundowns in the Nedbank Cup final.

F.C. Cape Town
In May 2008, he joined First Division team F.C. Cape Town.

Karabükspor
In 2009 Emenike signed a one-year loan deal with Karabükspor. Emenike made his debut in the opening game of the 1.Lig season on 23 August 2009 in a 3–3 draw against Samsunspor. He would score his first goal on 11 October, against Kartal. Emenike would score his first hat-trick of his Turkish career in a 6–1 win over Mersin İdmanyurdu and score another hat-trick on 14 February 2010 in a 4–2 win over Kayseri Erciyesspor. He went on to score 16 goals in the 1.Lig, leading the club to the title and automatic promotion.

Emenike won the 1.Lig Best Foreign Player award at the end of the 2009–10 season, and also had his contract extended by three years for 300.000 €.

Emenike scored on his Süper Lig debut, helping Karabükspor to a 2–1 victory over Manisaspor. On 28 November 2010, he scored his first hat-trick in Süper Lig career in a 3–0 win over Bucaspor. He subsequently scored a total of 14 goals in his debut Süper Lig season.

In May 2011, he initiated a lawsuit against the newspaper 'Haber Turk' for what Emenike's agents describe as "misleading" and "malicious" claim that Emenike's age is 7 years different from what is shown on his passport.

Fenerbahçe
On 25 May 2011, Emenike joined Fenerbahçe for an undisclosed fee, believed to be around 9 million euros.

Spartak Moscow

On 28 July 2011, he was sold to Spartak Moscow for €10 million due to the match fixing claim, which has been disproven by the court later on, involving Fenerbahce and Emenike. Emenike had never appeared in a competitive match for Fenerbahçe.

Emenike made his debut on the opening game of the season coming on as a substitute for Ari in the 76th minute, against Anzhi Makhachkala on 14 August 2011. Emenike made his Europa League debut in a 2–2 draw against Polish side Legia Warsaw in the first leg of the qualification round. Emenike scored his first goal for the club with a 2–2 draw against CSKA Moscow. On 29 October 2011, Emenike scored his first hat-trick in a 3–0 win over Lokomotiv Moscow and the next game when Spartak played against Lokomotiv, he would score twice.

Towards the end of season, Emenike was fined about US$17,000 for an offensive gesture after Dynamo Moscow fans, who racially abused him during a match between Spartak and Dynamo, which Spartak won 3–1 and he scored. Vladimir Vasilyev, a Russian FA's ethics committee official, explained the fine, stating it was "an adequate punishment".

In the last game of the season against champions Zenit Saint Petersburg, Emenike scored the second goal in the game but received a red card after he appeared to do a mock vein-tapping in preparation for an imaginary heroin injection. Eventually, Spartak Moscow would win 3–2. After the game, Emenike made an explanation celebration for gratitude to his parents The meeting between House of Football Control and Disciplinary Committee refused to consider the incident and shifted responsibility for the decision by the Ethics Committee.

In the 2011–12 season, Emenike scored 13 goals (all in the league) and is the second top-scorer behind Artyom Dzyuba, who scored one more than Emenike. At the end of the season, Emenike signed a four-year deal and increased his buy-out clause to $42 million.

In 2012–13 season, Emenike scored the fastest goal in the history of the Russian League, within 10 seconds of kick-off in a 2–1 win over Alania Vladikavkaz on the opening game of the season. In the Champions League qualifying round against his former club Fenerbahçe, he scored in a 2–1 first leg win. Eventually, Spartak Moscow would go through to the Group Stage of the Champions League. In Matchday Two of the Group Stage, Emenike scored a brace in a 3–2 loss against Scottish side Celtic. After the match, Nigerian teammate Efe Ambrose spoke to Goal.com praising Emenike for his "electrifying performance" But in the second half of the season, his playing time was reduced, due to injuries. In 2013–14 season, Emenike scored three goals in four matches, to send the club into first place in the league in the first-four matches. When Emenike left Spartak he said that Valeriy Karpin (Spartak coach) was like a father to him.

Return to Fenerbahçe

In August 2013, Emenike moved back to Turkey by returning to Fenerbahçe for a fee worth around €13m (£10.2M). He was noted to be "thrilled" and was quoted saying Fenerbahce had always been a dream for him, and he had returned to perform for the fans and win championships. His first match for Fenerbahçe against Torku Konyaspor ended in a 3–2 loss. He scored his first goal for Fenerbahçe in October 2013 against Kayserispor in the 94th minute, securing a last minute win. He scored two more against Gaziantepspor a week later, while Fenerbahçe won 3–1.

Loan to Al Ain
On 11 July 2015, Emenike signed for Al Ain on a season-long loan. On 13 January 2016, after spending six months at the club, Emenike returned to Fenerbahçe after his loan move was terminated by the club.

Loan to West Ham United
On 31 January 2016, Emenike signed for West Ham United on loan until the end of the season with an option to make it permanent. On 6 February, Emenike made his debut as a 73rd-minute substitute replacing Michail Antonio in a 1–0 defeat at Southampton. On 21 February, Emenike scored a brace in a 5–1 win against Blackburn Rovers in the FA Cup, his first and only goals for the club.

Olympiakos
On 6 July 2017, Emenike joined Greek champions Olympiacos for a fee of €3.8 million on a two-year deal. On 25 July 2017, Emenike made his first appearance for the club, scoring a last minute goal, helping Olympiacos to a 3–1 victory against FK Partizan, in the 1st leg of the UEFA Champions League third qualifying round. On 19 September 2017, thanks to a brace scored by Emenike at second half, Olympiacos won 2-1 Asteras Tripoli, at this 2017-18 Greek Cup clash, at Georgios Karaiskakis Stadium.

Since November 2017, the future of Emenike is up in the air, less than three weeks before the opening of the winter transfer market. According to various sources, the Olympiacos striker is under orders to train alone even though he is not recovering from any injury. In all likelihood, Emenike is set to depart the Superleague Greece champions in the January transfer window, with CSKA Moscow mentioned as a possible destination. The striker had complained of being unsafe at his home in Greece and Olympiacos were forced to hire extra security to protect him.

On 29 December 2017, Emenike has thanked Turkish giants Galatasaray for their brave step in reaching out to embattled former Arsenal and Ivorian defender, Emmanuel Eboue, who lost a bitter divorce battle, with his wife Aurelie awarded all of their assets, had to hide from cops and bailiffs after being ordered by a judge to transfer his remaining Enfield home in England to his wife.

On 17 July 2018, he mutually resolved his contract with Olympiacos.

Loan to Las Palmas
On the last day of the winter transfer window 2018, Emenike agreed to play on loan from Olympiacos to Las Palmas until the end of the season as he had not much playing time in Olympiacos matches.
Few days after his signing the Spanish club have announced that Emenike is now being treated for a knee problem and no date has been fixed for his return to action. “An MRI scan was conducted the same night which indicated the presence of an osteochondral lesion at the level of the internal femoral condyle and swelling of the internal lateral ligament,” Las Palmas explained.

Westerlo
On 27 August 2019, Emenike started to trials with Belgian 2nd division outfit K.V.C. Westerlo, for a potential contract. On 16 September 2019, he has signed with the club. Westerlo became his 10th professional club. On 14 November 2019, Westerlo released Emenike, following 5 games played for the club, due to "not bringing the level that both parties had intended" by the pertinent official club statement.

International career

Emenike was called up to the Nigeria national football team for a friendly against Sierra Leone. He was called up to Nigeria's 23-man squad for the Africa Cup of Nations. On 21 January 2013, he scored in Nigeria's opening AFCON match against Burkina Faso in a 1–1 draw. He also scored the first goal in the quarter final match between Nigeria and Côte d'Ivoire which Nigeria won 2–1. On 3 February, Emenike scored a 30-yard free kick giving his country a 2–1 win over Côte d'Ivoire in the African Cup of Nations.

In 2013, he became part of the third Nigerian team to win the African Cup of Nations – Nigeria's first continental victory since 1994. His four goals proved crucial to Nigeria's progress through the tournament, and he was named to the team of the African Cup of Nations Team of the Tournament. However, Emenike wasn't included in the final, due to a thigh injury. He also received the Pepsi Tournament Top Scorer, with four goals, along with Ghana's Wakaso Mubarak.

In March 2013, Emenike was left out of the Nigerian squad for the World Cup qualifier, due to hamstring injury, which Emenike criticised Nigeria's coach and officials of ignoring him. In June 2013, Emenike wasn't included for Nigeria's squad at the 2013 FIFA Confederations Cup. After four month without being called up, Emenike was called up for August's Mandela Cup friendly match but did not participate due to injury. Emenike celebrated his absence from Eagles in Sept 2013 when he played in the 2014 world cup qualifier against Malawi – played in Calabar. He scored a goal in the two-nil win by the Super Eagles – a win which took them to the final round of world cup qualifiers. He came on as a substitute three days later in a friendly match against Burkina Faso, played in Kaduna – he scored the fourth goal in a 4–1 win for the Eagles.

On 13 October 2013, in the first-leg of last round of the World Cup qualifier against Ethiopia, he scored twice to give the Super Eagles a 2–1 lead going into the second-leg On 20 October 2015 he announced his retirement.

Personal life
Emenike married former Most Beautiful Girl in Nigeria winner Iheoma Nnadi in 2016. The couple welcomed their 1st child in August 2017. They had their 2nd child on 13 March 2020. Emenike is the cousin of US international and West Bromwich Albion striker Daryl Dike.

Career statistics

Club

International goals
Scores and results list Nigeria's goal tally first.

Honours

Club
Karabükspor
 TFF First League: 2009–10

Fenerbahçe
 Süper Lig: 2013–14
 Turkish Super Cup: 2014

International
Nigeria
 Africa Cup of Nations (1): 2013

Individual
 TFF First League Best Foreign Player: 2009–10
List of 33 Top Players of the Russian Premier League: 2011–12
 Africa Cup of Nations Golden Boot: 2013
Africa Cup of Nations Team of the Tournament: 2013
CAF Team of the Year: 2013

References

External links

1987 births
Living people
Nigerian footballers
Nigerian expatriate footballers
Süper Lig players
Kardemir Karabükspor footballers
Fenerbahçe S.K. footballers
Expatriate footballers in Belgium
Expatriate footballers in Turkey
Expatriate footballers in Russia
Expatriate footballers in Spain
FC Spartak Moscow players
Russian Premier League players
Nigeria international footballers
2013 Africa Cup of Nations players
2014 FIFA World Cup players
F.C. Cape Town players
Nigerian expatriate sportspeople in Turkey
TFF First League players
Africa Cup of Nations-winning players
Expatriate footballers in England
Al Ain FC players
West Ham United F.C. players
Association football forwards
Premier League players
UAE Pro League players
Olympiacos F.C. players
UD Las Palmas players
K.V.C. Westerlo players
Sportspeople from Anambra State